Phlogophora conservuloides is a species of moth of the family Noctuidae. It is found from Sikkim to Taiwan.

References

Moths described in 1898
Hadeninae